Ragnar Svensson may refer to
Ragnar Svensson (sailor) (1882–1959), Swedish sailor 
Ragnar Svensson (wrestler) (born 1934), Swedish wrestler
Eric Ragnor Sventenius (Erik Ragnar Svensson, 1910–1973), Hispano-Swedish botanist